Donna Norris (1934 Culver City, California–October 7, 2013) played in the All-American Girls Professional Baseball League.

Baseball career
During her professional baseball career, Norris played in the positions of right field and utility infielder for two teams in 1953: the South Bend Blue Sox (playing 11 games) and the Fort Wayne Daisies (playing 5 games). She was described as a “sharp fielding infielder” and a “rookie flychaser.”

Education
Norris earned a degree from Pepperdine University in Physical Education.

Family life
When Norris died she was survived by five daughters: Carmel, Curtis, Alesia, Campbell and Christi; a brother Maurice, a sister, Karen, 12 grandchildren and 13 great-grandchildren.

Career statistics
Seasonal batting record

References

American female baseball players
1934 births
2013 deaths
All-American Girls Professional Baseball League players
21st-century American women